Max Weber (24 January 1922 – 29 August 2007) was an East German race walker.

Weber won the bronze medal in the 50 km walk at the 1958 European Championships in Stockholm. He represented Germany at the 1960 Olympics in Rome, finishing 13th in the same event.

References

1922 births
2007 deaths
German male racewalkers
Athletes (track and field) at the 1960 Summer Olympics
Olympic athletes of the United Team of Germany
People from Laucha an der Unstrut
European Athletics Championships medalists
Sportspeople from Saxony-Anhalt